William Nicholson Fischer (3 October 1883 – 15 October 1917) was an Australian rules footballer who played with Melbourne in the Victorian Football League (VFL). He was killed in action in Belgium in World War I.

Family
One of the six children of Henry and Isabelle Fischer, née Mathieson, he was born at Kilmore, Victoria on 3 Oct 1883. He attended Kilmore State School.

Football
Recruited from Tatura, he played his first and only senior game for Melbourne against Carlton, at the MCG on 29 May 1909 (round nine). It was a close match until three-quarter time, when Carlton drew away to win by 23 points, 12.8 (80) to 8.9 (57).

Soldier
His brother, also an excellent footballer, Henry Mathieson Fischer (1880–1960), had served in the Boer War, and became a policeman, retiring as the officer in charge of the police station at Hawthorn, Victoria.

Bill Fischer enlisted in the First AIF on 13 December 1915, giving his occupation as draper—he had been working in Kyabram prior to his enlistment—and his status as single. He was promoted to sergeant on 9 July 1917.

Death
He was killed in action, serving with the 8th Brigade Australian Field Artillery, during the Battle of Passchendaele on 15 October 1917, and is buried at the Potijze Chateau Grounds Cemetery, Belgium. His name is located at panel 15 in the Commemorative Area at the Australian War Memorial.

See also
 List of Victorian Football League players who died on active service

Footnotes

References
 Died on Service: Fischer, The Argus, Tuesday 20 November 1917), p.1.
 Australians on Service: Killed: Fischer, The Argus, Tuesday 20 November 1917), p.6.
 Obituary: Corporal (sic) William N. Fischer, The Kilmore Free Press, (Thursday, 22 November 1917), p.3.
 Local and General (Obituary), The Broadford Courier, (Friday, 23 November 1917), p.2.
 Died on Service: Fischer, The Argus, Saturday 24 November 1917), p.11.
 Australian Casualties: Lists Nos. 367 and 368: Victoria: Killed in Action (Fischer, Sgt. W. N., Kilmore, 15/10/17), The Argus, (Tuesday, 11 December 1917), p.5.
 In Memoriam: On Active Service: Fischer, The Argus, (Wednesday, 15 October 1919), p.1.

External links

 Australian World War I Service Record: William Nicholson Fischer (19761)
 Demonwiki Biography: Bill Fischer
 Australian War Memorial Roll of Honour – William Nicholson Fischer (19761)
 Commonwealth War Graves Commission: Casualty Details: Fischer, William Nicholson (19761)

1883 births
1917 deaths
Melbourne Football Club players
Australian military personnel killed in World War I
Tatura Football Club players
Australian rules footballers from Victoria (Australia)
Burials at Potijze Château Grounds Commonwealth War Graves Commission Cemetery